Shraddha is an Indian television series which aired on Star Plus channel. It is a tale about the Jaiswal family based in Ujjain. The show was produced by Manish Goswami

Plot 
Shraddha is the story of a girl named Shraddha who resides in Ujjain with her family – parents, uncle and aunt, two older brothers and their wives. She has another brother who studies in Pune. Shraddha is going to marry Amit whom her parents have selected for her. Shraddha's actual aim in life is to fulfill her parents' dream of visiting the chaar dhaams (the four main places of holy pilgrimage for Hindus). Life seems good but Shraddha doesn’t know that her second brother and her sisters-in-law, in fact, don't want the pilgrimage to materialize so they can save money.

Meanwhile, her uncle and aunt instigate her youngest brother Ashok (Siddharth Sethi) to start a business of his own. They give him money but also steal it. Finally Shraddha’s parents offer him their pilgrimage money. Shraddha gets upset and instead asks Amit for their wedding to be a simple affair. Amit and his parents agree and the money saved for Shraddha’s wedding goes to Ashok. Meanwhile the pilgrimage money gets stolen by her sisters in law. Shraddha requests Ashok to hand over his business money to his parents but Ashok runs away from home.

Shraddha asks Amit to postpone their wedding but this results in their engagement being called off altogether. She decides to move on but realizes that not only her second brother and her sisters-in-law, but also her uncle and aunt are greedy and only want the house and money for themselves. The only people she can trust are her parents and eldest brother, Santosh (Kashif Khan). She soon meets Swayam who says he is a photographer but actually wants to usurp their house to make a mall. He is the brother of Satya Sarkar who is in league with her uncle and aunt. In order to raise money, Shraddha accepts to work with him and they become good friends. Later his truth is exposed only after she gets the money. She is also accused of having an affair with him and is thrown out of the house. Her parents are very hurt and also leave house. They meet up with Shraddha in the temple and believe her. Together they go to stay with Pratima who is Shraddha’s friend.

Now the focus shifts to Pratima's life and her own troubles. She can’t conceive which is why her husband misbehaves with her and is physically abusive. Pratima is actually married to Satya, Swayam's brother. Shraddha learns of Pratima's plight and emotionally supports her. Shraddha's family is looking for her parents to get some property papers signed by them. During this time her eldest brother Santosh realizes the truth and feels guilty. Meanwhile Pratima learns of Satya and Swayam's search for Shraddha as they too want her signature for the mall as Shraddha is the sole owner of the land. When Pratima learns of this, she sends Shraddha away.

Swayam decides to marry Shraddha and then get her sign willingly. Pratima overhears this plan and warns her family. Satya breaks all ties with Pratima when he learns that she's been helping Shraddha. On the other hand Swayam finds and says sorry to Shraddha, Shraddha refuses to forgive him but her parents agree. Swayam helps Shraddha’s mother to recover her eyesight as she is blind and Shraddha forgives him. Then Swayam asks for Shraddha’s hand in marriage. Everything goes alright until Swayam starts feeling guilty as he has fallen in love with Shraddha. Finally he reveals the truth and leaves. Shraddha is heartbroken.

Manoj (middle brother) finds Shraddha’s parents, ask for forgiveness and takes them back home. Shraddha agrees to marry Raja who is actually a goon. Santosh doesn’t want it but Namrata, his wife, convinces him that otherwise she would be married to Swayam who will make her pay forever and also they will later save her from Raja. Swayam learns of it and rushes to save Shraddha's life. Raja is jailed, Shraddha forgives Swayam, the family is repentant and finally Shraddha Swayam marries before happiness also knocks Pratima’s life as she reveals the truth he is impotent and not her. Satya accepts her as his wife and also asks for forgiveness.

Cast 
Neha Janpandit as Shraddha Jaiswal / Shraddha Swayam Khurana
Barun Sobti as Swayam Khurana 
Sudhir Dalvi as Jagdish Jaiswal, Shraddha's father 
Sukanya Kulkarni as Laxmi Jagdish Jaiswal, Shraddha's mother 
Kashif Khan as Santosh (Sannu) Jaiswal, Shraddha's elder brother 
Karuna Pandey as Namrata Santosh Jaiswal Shraddha's elder sister-In-Law
Siddharth Dhawan as Manoj Jaiswal, Shraddha's middle brother 
Shashank Sethi as Ashok Jaiswal, Shraddha's brother 
Vineet Kumar as Raja

References

StarPlus original programming
Indian television series
Indian drama television series
2009 Indian television series debuts
2010 Indian television series endings